Tantsud tähtedega 2006 was the first season of the Estonian version of Dancing with the Stars, and was broadcast on the Estonian television channel Kanal 2. The hosts were Mart Sander and Kristiina Heinmets-Aigro. The jury members were Jüri Nael, Kaie Kõrb, Merle Klandorf and Ants Tael.

Couples

Judges' scoring summary
Bold scores indicate the highest for that week. Red indicates the lowest score.  

The Best Score (40)

Averages

Highest and lowest scoring performances 
The best and worst performances in each dance according to the judges' marks are as follows:

Season 2006
2000s Estonian television series
2006 Estonian television series debuts
Estonian reality television series
2006 Estonian television seasons